Ryan Clement (born October 25, 1975) is a former American football quarterback. He played college for the Miami Hurricanes and professionally in NFL Europe, XFL, United Indoor Football and the Indoor Football League.

High school career
Clement attended Mullen High School in Denver, Colorado, lettering in football, basketball, and baseball.  He was the Mustangs' starting quarterback from the first game of his freshman year through his senior season and was a Colorado All-State football selection four years in a row.  Clement was selected to receive the Denver Post Gold Helmet Award presented to the state's top football athlete/scholar/citizen for the 1993/1994 school year.  He was also selected as a Parade magazine All-American his senior year.

College career
After graduating in 1994, Clement went on to attend the University of Miami, a college football powerhouse who had been hurt by NCAA sanctions.

With the Hurricanes, Clement would split the starting quarterback role in 1995 with Ryan Collins. Clement replaced Collins in the third game of the 1995 season against Virginia Tech when Collins was sidelined with an injury. Clement started the remaining 8 games, losing his first start to Florida State but finishing the season with 7 wins in a row. After a slow start in 1995, going 1-3 before finishing the season at 8-3, Miami would still have participated in a post-season bowl because of its strong finish. Miami, however, was ineligible for bowl game participation due to NCAA sanctions. This was Butch Davis's first year as Head Coach of the Hurricanes.

Clement took over the starting role full-time in 1996, leading the Big East in pass efficiency with a 147.1 rating. Clement was a leading candidate for the Davey O’Brien National Quarterback Award in 1996 and was also an All-Big East Conference selection. He led the Hurricanes to the Big East title shared with Virginia Tech and Syracuse (all finished 6-1 in conference play) with an impressive performance in the final game of the season at Syracuse. Clement threw for three touchdowns to help Miami defeat the Donovan McNabb led Orangemen 38-31, earning Big East “Player of the Week” honors and giving Miami a share of the Big East conference crown. Miami finished the 1996 season 9-3, with a win over Virginia in the Carquest Bowl and ranked 14th in both the AP and coaches polls.

1997 proved to be an extremely difficult year for Clement and the Hurricanes. Miami, beset by the scholarship reductions due to NCAA violations under the Dennis Erickson tenure, and forced to play several true freshmen as starters in key positions, fell to a 5-6 record, their first losing record since 1979.

Clement led the Miami Hurricanes in 30 regular season games as the starting quarterback over three seasons, and led his team to a win in the 1996 Carquest Bowl in the only post-season game he started. He received the Walter Kichefski Football Award, selected by his coaches as the Miami player that most represents the characteristics Kichefski lived by: respect for fellow man, loyalty, dedication, sacrifice, motivation and inspiration.

Clement finished his career at Miami among the all-time statistical leaders in the following categories:
 Career Pass Completion Percentage:(Minimum 250 Attempts) - (443 of 747) - 59.3% (4th All-Time),
 Career Pass Completions:   443 (4th All-Time),
 Career Pass Attempts:      747 (4th All-Time),
 Career Passing Yardage:  6,004 (5th All-Time),
 Career Total Offense:    5,659 (5th All-Time),
 Career Touchdown Passes:    43 (6th All-Time).

He also owns two individual season marks for Pass Completion Percentage for the 1996 season of 60.3% (164 of 272) (6th All-Time) and for the 1995 season of 59.2% (199 of 201) (10th All-Time)

Professional
Clement would never play in the NFL, but in 1999 signed with the Scottish Claymores of NFL Europe. He would return to America in 2001, to play for the Las Vegas Outlaws of the newly created XFL. He started for Las Vegas in the XFL's first game, a nationally televised contest on NBC, where he threw for 188 yards and two touchdowns in the Outlaws' victory. Clement sustained a serious injury late in the first quarter of game two against the Memphis Maniax when defensive end Shante Carver was penalized for a late hit that caused a third degree separation of Clement's right (throwing) shoulder. Clement did not play the next three games due to this injury but returned to start game six against the Orlando Rage in Orlando. He was the starter in each of the Outlaw's remaining games but was again knocked out late in the fourth quarter of game nine (against the San Francisco Demons) when linebacker Jon Haskins hit Clement after the play was over and was ejected from the game.
The XFL would fold after its only championship game that spring. Ryan Clement completed his XFL quarterback career with the Las Vegas Outlaws with 805 passing yards, 78 completions in 136 attempts for a pass completion percentage of 57.4%. He threw for 9 touchdowns against 4 interceptions in the six games that he played.

Since the XFL, Clement returned to Denver. A political science major at Miami who also earned a J.D. degree, he now works as counsel for a Denver lobbying firm. He has talked of a comeback to football though, in the newly formed All American Football League.

In the Spring of 2008, Ryan Clement became the starting quarterback for the Colorado Ice in the Western Conference of the United Indoor Football league.

References

1975 births
Living people
American football quarterbacks
Colorado Crush (IFL) players
Las Vegas Outlaws (XFL) players
Miami Hurricanes football players
Scottish Claymores players
Players of American football from Denver